State Route 230 (SR 230) is a state highway central Elko County, Nevada, United States. It is a southern loop route off of Interstate 80 (I‑80) between Elko and Wells, serving the communities of Deeth and Welcome and various ranches within Starr Valley. The road follows a "U" shaped path and passes close to the East Humboldt Range. The road was constructed by 1962, but was not designated as a state highway until 1992.



Route description 
SR 230 begins at I‑80 at the Starr Valley Interchange, Exit 333. From its western terminus, SR 230 heads southward into the community of Deeth, where it meets County Road 753. After crossing over the Marys River and, quickly thereafter, the Humboldt River, SR 230 meets Starr Valley Loop (which continues south to Nevada State Route 229) before heading eastward. The road then turns abruptly northward to meet its end at the Welcome Interchange, Exit 343 of I‑80.

History 
The road has existed as Starr Valley Road since 1962, even before I-80 replaced U.S. Route 40 (US 40) in the area. After I-80 was designated in the area, the bridge over I-80 in Deeth was completed in 1965, and the bridge at the east terminus in 1968. The bridges over the Humboldt and Mary's Rivers were completed in 1983. It was not until 1992, however, until this road was formally designated a state highway by NDOT. Since establishment, the alignment of the route has not changed.

Major intersections

See also

 List of state highways in Nevada

References

External links

230
Transportation in Elko County, Nevada